The 22419/22420 Suhaildev Superfast Express is a Superfast Express train belonging to Northern Railway zone that runs between  and  in India. It is currently being operated with 22419/22420 train numbers on four days in a week basis.

The train is named after Suhaildev, a legendary king from Shravasti.

Service

The 22419/Suhaildev SF Express has an average speed of 56 km/hr and covers 815 km in 14h 40m. The 22420/Suhaildev SF Express has an average speed of 56 km/hr and covers 815 km in 14h 40m.

Time Table

Coach composition

The train has standard LHB rake with max speed of 130 kmph. The train consists of 21 coaches :

 1 AC First-class
 1 AC First-cum-AC II Tier
 1 AC II Tier
 3 AC III Tier
 7 Sleeper coaches
 6 General
 2 Head on Generation

Traction

Both trains are hauled by a Ghaziabad-based WAP-7 (HOG) equipped locomotive from Ghazipur City to Anand Vihar Terminal and vice versa.

Direction reversal

The train reverses its direction 1 times:

See also 

 Ghazipur City railway station
 Anand Vihar Terminal railway station
 Sadbhawna Express
 Ghazipur City–Anand Vihar Terminal Express

Notes 
it's started in the name of maharaja suheldev vasudev pasi

References

External links 

 22419/Suhaildev SF Express
 22420/Suhaildev SF Express

Transport in Delhi
Transport in Ghazipur
Express trains in India
Rail transport in Delhi
Rail transport in Uttar Pradesh
Railway services introduced in 2016
Named passenger trains of India